The Israeli Education and Youth Corps (Heil HaHinuh VeHaNo'ar) is the IDF Manpower Directorate corps responsible for the education of soldiers and commanders in Israel's military. It is designed to instruct and develop national values among the troops.

Goal and designation
According to former Chief Education Officer Avner Shalev, the aims of the education system in the IDF are to increase the motivation and morale of the troops and units. This is achieved by introducing cultural activities into the lives of soldiers, teaching them about the country and its values—both national and universal—as well as by teaching them about the nature of their duties as soldiers and citizens of the state.

Structure
The Education and Youth Corps is divided into two main brigades - the Magen division and the education division - as well as 6 independent units directly subordinate to the Chief Education Officer:
The Jerusalem College
Planning and organization branch
Education and youth training base (Bahad HaHinukh VeHaNo'ar)
The School for Leadership (Beit HaSefer LeManhigut, abbr. Bislam)
The army weekly magazine Bamahane
Israeli Army Radio (Galei Tzahal, abbr. Galatz)

Magen division
The Magen (an abbreviation for Morot-Hayalot (teacher soldiers), Makam, Gadna and Nahal), comprises four IDF education programs:
Mak'am (an abbreviation for Merkaz Kidum Ukhlusiyot Meyuhadot - Center for the Advancement of Special Population Groups), a program initiated by Rafael Eitan to call up and support soldiers who would otherwise not be called up, such as those with serious educational deficiencies (lack of compulsory education), long criminal histories, etc. These are termed 'adaptation problems' in the IDF, and those with a rating of 40-60 are considered Mak'am youth. The Mak'am base is called Havat HaShomer and located in the north of the country, and trains those Mak'am youth with the most serious problems.
Teacher soldiers, a program to train soldiers to become teachers in the civilian sector.
Gadna, short paramilitary training programs for high school youth. The Gadna program has 3 such training bases - Tzalmon in the north, Ju'ara in the center, and Sde Boker in the south of the country.
Nahal Nucleus (Gar'in Nahal), another pre-military-age program.

Mihve Alon, a training base for new immigrants not proficient in the Hebrew language, is also subordinate to the Magen division.

Education division
The education division serves as the professional guide for the other units of the corps, and of the IDF in general. It is divided into 6 branches:
Mak'am branch
Education and Hasbara branch
Culture branch
Aliyah branch
Arm and corps branch
Moriah branch

Education and youth training base 
The Education and youth training base, or by its name Sha'arei Avraham (Abraham's gates) was built near the Re'em Junction in the Lachish Valley near Kiryat Mal'akhi.

Many of the soldiers in various roles in the Education Corps get their training in the Youth Education Training Base.

Among these roles:
Mashakit Hod מש"קית הו"ד - teaching and command NCO
Madan Merhav and Basis מד"ן מרחב ובסיס - a youth guide in the base and region
Mashakit Hinukh מש"קית חינוך - education NCO
Mashakit Aliya מש"קית עלייה - immigration NCO
Military ensemble
Museum guides

The teacher-soldiers who are also a part of the Education Corps don't get their training in the Youth Education Training Base, but in a civic seminary called Ramot Shapira, which is in moshav Beit Meir, next to Jerusalem. this is a result of the "lending agreement" with the Education Minister of Israel.

Insignia 

The emblem of the Education and Youth Corps is composed of four stripes integrating into one flame.

Three of them (different shades of blue) represent the three different centers of the corps and the fourth (colored white) represents the headquarters of the corps.

Chief officers

See also
 Mechinat Rabin

References

External links
Israel Defense Forces: Manpower Directorate
Adi Sherzer, Israeli Military Education: Historical Overview of a Unique Phenomenon (1941-2004), British Journal of Middle Eastern Studies (2021)

Corps of Israel
Education in Israel